The 2013 CONCACAF U-17 Championship qualification tournaments took place in 2012 to qualify national teams for the 2013 CONCACAF U-17 Championship.

Caribbean zone

First round

Group 1

At Kingston, Jamaica

Group 2	

At Havana, Cuba

Group 3	

At Port-au-Prince, Haiti

Group 4	

At Trinidad & Tobago

Group 5

At Basseterre, St. Kitts. Grenada were also drawn into this group but later withdrew.

Central American zone

Guatemala will host the qualifying group, matches will take place between 7–15 December. Panama qualify automatically as hosts.

References

External links
Tournament at soccerway.com

qualifying
Qual
CONCACAF U-17 Championship qualification